Olivier Guichard (27 July 1920 – 20 January 2004) was a French politician. He was born in Néac and joined the French Army in 1944 and served until the end of World War II, during which, he earned the Médaille militaire and the Croix de guerre. At the end of his life he also was a grand officer of the Légion d'honneur.

In 1947, he joined the gaulliste mouvement. He occupied various local elected offices. He has been a member of parliament and several time minister. From 1969 until 1972, he was Minister of National Education. Between 1972 and 1974, he was Minister of Public Works. And between 1976 and 1977, he was Minister of Justice.

Between 1967 and 1968, he was a member of the Union pour la nouvelle République, then between 1968 and 1978 he was a member of the Union of Democrats for the Republic and finally from 1978 until 1997 he was a member of the Rally for the Republic. He died on 20 January 2004 in Paris.

Political career 

Governmental functions

Minister of Industry : 1967–1968.

Minister of Planning and Land Management : 1968–1969.

Minister of National Education : 1969–1972.

Minister of Equipment, Housing and Tourism : 1972–1974.

Minister of State, minister of Land Management, Equipment and Transports : March–May 1974.

Minister of State, Keeper of the Seals : 1976–1977.

Electoral mandates

National Assembly of France

Member of the National Assembly of France for Loire-Atlantique : Elected in 1967, but he became minister / Reelected in 1968, but he stays minister / Reelected in 1973, but he stays minister / 1974–1976 (Became minister) / 1978–1997. Elected in 1967, reelected in 1968, 1973, 1978, 1981, 1986, 1988, 1993.

Regional Council

President of the Regional Council of Pays de la Loire : 1974–1998. Elected in 1986, reelected in 1992.

Regional councillor of Pays de la Loire : 1974–1998. Elected in 1986, reelected in 1992.

General Council

General councillor of Loire-Atlantique : 1970–1982. Reelected in 1976.

Municipal Council

Mayor of Néac : 1962–1971. Reelected in 1965.

Municipal councillor of Néac : 1962–1971. Reelected in 1965.

Mayor of La Baule-Escoublac : 1971–1995. Reelected in 1977, 1983, 1989.

Municipal councillor of La Baule-Escoublac : 1971–1995. Reelected in 1977, 1983, 1989.

1920 births
2004 deaths
People from Gironde
Mayors of places in Nouvelle-Aquitaine
Mayors of places in Pays de la Loire
Rally of the French People politicians
Union for the New Republic politicians
Union of Democrats for the Republic politicians
Rally for the Republic politicians
French Ministers of Justice
French Ministers of Public Works
French Ministers of National Education
Deputies of the 3rd National Assembly of the French Fifth Republic
Deputies of the 4th National Assembly of the French Fifth Republic
Deputies of the 5th National Assembly of the French Fifth Republic
Deputies of the 6th National Assembly of the French Fifth Republic
Deputies of the 7th National Assembly of the French Fifth Republic
Deputies of the 8th National Assembly of the French Fifth Republic
Deputies of the 9th National Assembly of the French Fifth Republic
Deputies of the 10th National Assembly of the French Fifth Republic
Lycée Condorcet alumni
University of Paris alumni
French military personnel of World War II
Recipients of the Croix de Guerre 1939–1945 (France)
Grand Officiers of the Légion d'honneur